The George Washington Baines House is located in the city of Salado, county of  Bell, in the U.S. state of Texas.  It was added to the National Register of Historic Places listings in Bell County, Texas in 1983, and designated a Recorded Texas Historic Landmark in 1981.

George Washington Baines was the father of Joseph Wilson Baines, who was the father of Rebekah Baines, mother of Lyndon B. Johnson.  A Baptist minister, Rev. Baines had been president of Baylor University, and traveled for the Baptist State Convention when he built this house around 1866. The Greek Revival style house is a frame one-and-one-half-story structure. The front of the house features a double-door transomed entrance. The porch is supported by square columns. Baines lived in this house until his death in 1883.

See also

National Register of Historic Places listings in Bell County, Texas
Recorded Texas Historic Landmarks in Bell County

References

Houses completed in 1866
Houses on the National Register of Historic Places in Texas
Houses in Bell County, Texas
Recorded Texas Historic Landmarks
1866 establishments in Texas
National Register of Historic Places in Bell County, Texas